The Norwegian Archaeological Society is an interest organization for archaeology.

Formed in 1936, its first secretary-general was Anton Wilhelm Brøgger, who served until his death in 1951. The purpose of the society is to propagate results of Norwegian archaeological research. It releases the publication Viking.

The current president is Lyder Marstrander; board members are Sonja Vibecke Robøle, Christian Størmer, Leif-Dan Birkemoe, Per Kristian Skulberg, Ronny Henriksen, Ellen Drage Støeng, Hanne Ekstrøm Jordahl, Frode Iversen (secretary general) and Cathrine Brattekværne (secretary).

References

External links 
Norwegian Archaeological Society
Scientific organisations based in Norway
Education in Norway
Organizations established in 1936